Events from the year 2003 in Scotland.

Incumbents 

First Minister and Keeper of the Great Seal – Jack McConnell 
 Secretary of State for Scotland – Helen Liddell until 13 June; then Alistair Darling

Law officers 
 Lord Advocate – Lord Boyd of Duncansby
 Solicitor General for Scotland – Elish Angiolini
 Advocate General for Scotland – Lynda Clark

Judiciary 
 Lord President of the Court of Session and Lord Justice General – Lord Cullen of Whitekirk
 Lord Justice Clerk – Lord Gill
 Chairman of the Scottish Land Court – Lord McGhie

Events 
 29 January – Nat Fraser is found guilty of murdering his wife, Arlene, who went missing almost five years earlier, and is sentenced to life imprisonment with a recommendation to serve a minimum of 25 years behind bars.
 15 February – Up to 100,000 people march in Glasgow to protest against the looming Iraq War.
 25 February – The Land Reform (Scotland) Act 2003 receives royal assent.
 3 May – 2003 Scottish Parliament election: the  Labour and Liberal Democrat coalition led by First Minister Jack McConnell win a majority of seats and are re-elected. The Scottish Green Party and the Scottish Socialist Party significantly increase their representation and the Scottish Senior Citizens Unity Party gains one seat. 
 9 August – Temperatures at Greycrook in the Scottish Borders reach 32.9 °C, the highest recorded in Scotland until 2022.
 25 August – Glasgow Zoo closes.
 1 September – Cairngorms National Park created, Scotland's second national park.
 21 October – Keith O'Brien is proclaimed a cardinal by John Paul II.
 24 November – The high court in Glasgow imposes a minimum sentence of 27 years for Al Ali Mohmed Al Megrahi, the Libyan national convicted of bombing Pan Am Flight 103 over Lockerbie.
 Ownership of the Barra Estate is passed by the owner, Ian MacNeil, to the Scottish Government.

Deaths 
 26 January – George Younger, Conservative politician, former Secretary of State for Scotland (born 1931)
 14 February – Dolly, cloned sheep (born 1996)
 30 July – Steve Hislop, motorcycle racer, killed in helicopter accident (born 1962)
 25 September – Alastair Borthwick, broadcaster and mountaineer (born 1913)

The arts
 7 April – James Robertson's historical novel Joseph Knight is published.
 22 November – Two Lochs Radio begins broadcasting.
 Lin Anderson's first "Tartan Noir" novel Driftnet is published.
 Anne Donovan's first full-length novel Buddha Da is published.
 The folk band Harem Scarem is formed.
 Scottish hip hop duo Silibil N' Brains begin performing in the guise of California rappers (in London).

See also 
 2003 in England
 2003 in Northern Ireland
 2003 in Wales

References 

 
Years of the 21st century in Scotland
2000s in Scotland